Oil City is an unincorporated community located in north-western Jefferson County, Washington on the western coast of the United States and at the mouth of the Hoh River.  It was the site of large scale petroleum extraction during the late 19th and early 20th century. The oil companies concluded that oil reserves in the area were not of marketable quantities. The plotted area where Oil City was to be built proved too rugged and remote and the land was sold to unsuspecting investors who thought an oil boom still loomed in the region. Prospective investors were encouraged to buy land long after it was known Oil City would never be built. Almost one hundred years later the city plots remained obscure and undeveloped until 2008, when access to the site was made possible with road use agreements between the developer and the logging companies in the area. Oil City is now a burgeoning off-grid community nestled next to the Olympic National Park and the only private property available between La Push to the north and Queets to the south. Oil City is governed loosely by a small landowners' association.

References

Unincorporated communities in Washington (state)
Unincorporated communities in Jefferson County, Washington